GDLR may refer to:
 Galería de la Raza, an art gallery in San Francisco, California
 General de la Rey Regiment, an infantry regiment of the South African Army
 Grimsby District Light Railway